University of Illinois may refer to:

University of Illinois Urbana-Champaign (flagship campus)
University of Illinois Chicago
University of Illinois Springfield
University of Illinois system

It can also refer to:
Illinois Fighting Illini, the athletic teams of the Urbana–Champaign campus
Illinois Fighting Illini men's basketball
Illinois Fighting Illini football